Stuart Robert Purser (February 8, 1907 - January 26, 1986) was an American painter and academic. He was the chairman of the Art Department at his alma mater, Louisiana College, and at the University of Florida, and the author of two books.

Purser completed four New Deal era murals. He painted the mural Farm Scene with Senator Bankhead for the Carrollton, Alabama post office, the mural Steamboats on the Mississippi for the Gretna, Louisiana post office, the mural Southern Pattern for the Ferriday, Louisiana post office, and the mural Ginnin' Cotton for the Leland, Mississippi post office.  Ginnin' Cotton was the winning design for Mississippi in the 1939 48-State mural competition. His sketch for Ginnin' Cotton is in the Smithsonian American Art Museum.

Purser was married twice. His first wife was Ore Olive Glass with whom he had two children. His second wife was fellow artist Mary May with whom he had two more children. He remained married to Mary May until his death.

References

1907 births
1986 deaths
American male painters
American muralists
Louisiana Christian University alumni
People from Gainesville, Florida
People from Stamps, Arkansas
University of Florida faculty
20th-century American painters
20th-century American male artists